Trudi Le Caine, CM (née Gertrude Janowski) (1911 – September 5, 1999) was an arts patron involved with local and national arts initiatives in Ottawa, Ontario, Canada.

Born in Passau, Bavaria, she spent her youth in Teplitz-Schönau/Teplice-Šanov, Czechoslovakia before joining her stepfather, Arnold Walter, in Berlin, where he was a music editor and critic for the leftist journals Die Weltbühne and Vorwärts.  After fleeing Germany following the Nazi seizure of power in 1933, she lived first in Spain (which she had to leave after the outbreak of the Spanish Civil War in 1936) and France (where she studied at the Sorbonne) before emigrating to Canada to join her parents.  She settled in Ottawa in 1942, where her involvement with Le Groupe de la Place Royale, Opera Lyra Ottawa and the Council for the Arts in Ottawa led to recognition and awards such as the Order of Canada, the Lescarbot Award and the Victor Tolgesy Arts Award.

Though she had no children of her own, she made children's music education one of her causes, helping establish the Ottawa Children's Concerts in 1946 and later becoming a proponent of the Orff Approach (Orff Schulwerk, also called Music for Children) in music education in the Ottawa area. LeCaine also taught French at Broadview Public School in Ottawa. She also convinced the National Capital Commission to open the Rideau Canal during the winter for skating, which has now become famous as the world's longest skating rink.

In her honour, the Community Foundation of Ottawa-Carleton maintains the Trudi LeCaine Fund.

She was close to 50 when she married Hugh Le Caine, Canadian physicist and pioneer electronic musician.

References
 
 Trudi's Order of Canada citation

External links 
The Victor Tolgesy Arts Award
Carl Orff Canada Music for Children
Hugh and Trudi Le Caine fonds at Queen’s University Archives
Trudi Le Caine fonds at the National Gallery of Canada, Ottawa, Ontario

1911 births
1999 deaths
German emigrants to Canada
German expatriates in France
University of Paris alumni
Members of the Order of Canada
Czechoslovak emigrants to Germany